Ponta de Vera Cruz is a headland at the waterfront of the city Santa Maria in the south of Sal, Cape Verde. It is situated near the harbour of Santa Maria. There is a lighthouse on the headland, attached to a restaurant.

See also

 List of lighthouses in Cape Verde
 List of buildings and structures in Cape Verde

References

Vera Cruz
Geography of Sal, Cape Verde
Santa Maria, Cape Verde
Lighthouses in Cape Verde